This is a list of episodes of all seasons of the Australian television series The Biggest Loser.

Seasons

Season 1: 2006
The first season averaged approximately 1,400,000 viewers, with the finale watched by 2,300,000.

Season 2: 2007
{| class="wikitable"
|-
! style="background-color:#F79A3A; width:80px"| Ep#/Wk-Ep#
! style="background-color:#F79A3A; width:155px"| Original airdate
! style="background-color:#F79A3A; width:250px"| Episode Title / Event
! style="background-color:#F79A3A; width:190px"| Total viewers(Free-to-air rounded to nearest 1,000)
|-
! colspan=5 style="background-color:#F79A3A"| Week 1
|-
|height="10"|1/01-1
|Sunday, 4 February
|Season Premiere – Ajay Rochester welcomes 14 new contestants to the biggest loser white house and takes the contestants to their last supper before they are played back what and how much they were eating just moments before. The contestants weigh-in for the first time with Damien being the largest contestant ever. The contestants look at each other's dream outfits. Some of the contestants are already missing home. The contestants line up outside in weight order (smallest to largest) wearing singlets with their names and weights on and are shocked when not Bob and Jillian turn up but 2 brand new Australian trainers: Shannon and Michelle. The contestants then have to choose which trainers they want to be with then Bob and Jillian arrive.  
|1,170,000 (peaking at 1.45m)
|-
|height="10"|2/01-2
|Monday, 5 February
|Minor Challenge #1 – Movie Madness: – With Bob and Jillian's arrival has the contestants sent straight into their first training session which sees Sarah struggling the most for the red team and Gerard on the blue team. The contestants learn about their diet. The contestants were asked to pack an overnight bag and headed to a cinema for their first major challenge where in each duel, one member for each team will go head to head. Ajay will spin a wheel and reveal a seat number, the contestants had to race to the seat where they would find 2 foods, they must pick which has the least calories, the one who does get a point and the first team to 4 win soothing massages with the losing team must camp outside the house. The blue team won leaving the red team to camp. 
|1,077,695
|-
|height="10"|3/01-3
|Tuesday, 6 February
|Sarah Walks: – The red team return to find their punishment for losing the challenge. An ambulance suddenly appears at the house and takes Gerard away leaving Bob in concern. Sarah refuses to workout and is confronted by Michelle. Kelly loses focus on training worrying about Gerard and Gerard is found to be fine. Sarah calls it quits and leaves. 
|
|-
|height="10"|4/01-4
|Wednesday, 7 February
|Temptation #1 – Secret Service – The red team wake up to their first morning without Sarah and Jillian revives them with an intense training session. Alex injures his ankle leaving some members of the red team to question his work ethic. Gerard returns from hospital. Bob pays Sarah a visit at home to encourage her to return to the house with the help of Season 1's Cat however, this fails and Sarah decides to stay at home. The contestants walk outside to team coloured booths where they faced their first temptation where each contestant are in their team coloured booths with each round being tempted with foods, if they refuse to eat they must leave their booth with the last man standing wins and gets immunity and a new twist called the walk. The blue team stayed strong and was not tempted while Greg, Marty and Courtney at a 17 calorie watermelon. Round 2 had Greg a Marty refuse seeing Courtney winning immunity and the walk. 
|1,069,000
|-
|height="10"|5/01-5
|Thursday, 8 February
|The Walk #1 – Courtney: – Gerard cracks under pressure in training. The red team's cracks continue with some of them losing trust with Courtney with him winning immunity. Shannon spends one on one time with Gerard. Courtney's walk see him face 4 options: a contestant to get one on one training with a trainer, the blue team member to sit out at the challenge, a red-blue team member swap or give immunity away to someone else. Country chose the 24-hour training and gave it to Alex to have access to Jillian. 
|876,000
|-
|height="10"|6/01-6
|Friday, 9 February
|Major Challenge #1 – Sydney tower race : The teams arrive at Hyde park for their major challenge where the winning team gets the choice of fine dining or an intense training session with the national dragon boat racing team. The losing team would get the option not picked and a 5 kg penalty at the first weigh-in. To decide who sat out on the blue team, the teams had to answer a calorie question; the red team won and chose Mel to sit out. The teams had to race a distance of 4.5 km / 50 laps of the tower on the glass deck with each team member having to take the lead for 8 laps with at the end of each 8th lap, the leader must write their target weight loss on the platform. The fastest team to complete the 50 laps would win. The blue team won and chose fine dining leaving the red team with the dragon boat training and a 5 kg penalty at weigh-in. 
|
|-
! colspan=5 style="background-color:#F79A3A"| Week 2
|-
|height="10"|7/02-1
|Sunday, 11 February
|The Weigh-in #1 – The teams get their own individual rewards for the challenge with Gerard being the most tempted by ice cream. Michelle and Jillian try to help pick up the down red team by showing them messages from the past contestants including Adro and Kristy. Alex gets his 24hr training with Jillian and feels like the weak link the team. Marty struggles during last chance training. The teams had to race on rowing machines to decide who from the blue team would sit out of the weigh-in with it being between Marty and Mel and Marty won leaving Mel deflated. The red team chose Damien. Sam leaves after her weigh-in to head to hospital. The blue team still won the weigh-in sending the red team to elimination. 
|1,258,000
|-
|height="10"|8/02-2
|Monday, 12 February
|Elimination #1 – Alex / Sam Bows Out : – The red team are devastated after losing the weigh-in with small alliances starting to form. Alex is eliminated from the red team though being the biggest loser on their team. Jillian gets angry after the red team voted Alex out and gets it out on Courtney. Sam returns from hospital and informs the contestants that she cannot medically continue and has to leave. The teams have an outside training session with a footy team. Jillian and Courtney go at it. The teams have a fun competition. 
|1,204,000
|-
|height="10"|9/02-3
|Tuesday, 13 February
|Minor Challenge #2 – Beach Volleyball : Kelly's injury has worsened. Jillian works on Marty. The teams arrived at Manly beach for their minor challenge where the first team to win 2 out of 3 sets, scoring 21 points to win a set would win the challenge. The winning team would get a 3 course meal while the losing team would get to get on frozen / TV meals for 24 hrs. The red team wanted to win their first challenge and chose Michael to sit out of the challenge. Shannon and Michele joined their teams. The blue team won the first set and red won the second leaving it all down to the last set with the red team winning their first challenge. 
|993,000
|-
|height="10"|10/02-4
|Wednesday, 14 February
|Temptation #2 – The Circle of Pizza : – The blue team struggle with their frozen meals. The teams walked to temptation where they were faced with a large pizza split into 8 sections, under one of them contains immunity. If no one takes temptation then Courtney would retain immunity. Under another section included a plasma TV. The game would only end when all 8 sections have been taken. To increase chances, the pizzas got small over time. In round 1, Gerard went but as not all flags were taken he did not have to eat and the same happened in round 2. Round 3 saw Gerard get all the flags winning immunity leaving the blue team not happy with his decision. With immunity, Gerard won the walk. 
|
|-
|height="10"|11/02-5
|Thursday, 15 February
|The Walk #2 – Gerard – 2 New Contestants: The blue team express their views to Bob and Shannon over temptation and worry about what Gerard will bring back from the walk. Gerard heads on the walk where 4 new potential contestants arrive and Gerard would have to pick 2 of them to join the competition with their names on the stones in the vessels, he chooses Laura and P'eta. The contestants back at the house were called to the weigh-in room where Gerard and the new contestants arrived and P'eta and Laura weighed in. As they were new, they were given immunity. The new girls settle in as the teams debate who they want on their team. 
|1,047,000 
|-
|height="10"|12/02-6
|Friday, 16 February
|Major Challenge #2 – Plane Pull: –  While the teams headed to the challenge, Shannon and Michelle were shocked to find the new contestants and got to know each other and are put into their first training session and P'eta breaks down. The major challenge saw the teams pull a 9 tonne plane 150 metres down the tarmac. At the designated stopping points, one team member must run onto the plane and collect their own luggage which contained 10% of their body weight which they must drop off to the end of the track. The winning gets to choose which of the new contestants join their team and get letters from home. The red team chose Michael to sit out. Bob and Jillian joined their teams. Most of the way, the red team were in the lead until one of the ropes got caught underneath a wheel and had to backtrack which gave the blue team the ability to surge ahead and win leaving the red team devastated. 
|
|-
|-
! colspan=5 style="background-color:#F79A3A"| Week 3
|-
|height="10"|13/03-1
|Sunday, 18 February
|The Weigh-in (#2) – The teams return to the house and the blue team chose that P'eta to join their team with Laura heading to the Red team. Bob and Jillian arrive to tell the teams that they are leaving to head back to America leaving the teams upset. Shannan and Michelle have one last chat with their mentors. The teams had a bike race to determine who on the blue team will sit out the weigh-in. P'eta and courtney race against each other and courtney won for the reds. The blue team lost the weigh-in and headed to their first elimination.
|898,000
|-
|height="10"|14/03-2
|Monday, 19 February
|Elimination (#2): Kelly – The blue team start to form alliances and some try to persuade P'eta to join their side. In the elimination room, alliances are revealed and discussed, Kelly is eliminated. Michael is left upset. Shannan takes his team rock climbing. Michelle is relieved to see all her team safe and takes the team out for a basketball session. 
|1,155,000
|-
|height="10"|15/03-3
|Tuesday, 20 February
|Minor Challenge (#3): Treadmill endurance – Shannan works on Damien in training. The challenge saw 3 team members having to go on a treadmill and the last person standing would win for their team. The longer they go on, the tougher and faster it would get. Greg wins it for the red team and won his own personal cardio gym from workout world. The red team then had to decide whether they want the commando or not, they decided to accept the commando. 
|
|-
|height="10"|16/03-4
|Wednesday, 21 February
|Temptation (#3): Chocolate – The red team wake up to face the commando and Marty steps up to face off against the commando. Temptation saw the teams being tempted with a chocolate fountain and various food items to dip in the chocolate and eat with the person eating the most winning immnuity and the walk. After a lot of strategy talk, Pati ends up winning immunity.  
|1,003,000
|-
|height="10"|17/03-5
|Thursday, 22 February
|The Walk (#3): Pati – Shannan and Michelle are debriefed on temptation. P'eta and Laura talk about how they are settling in. The teams speculate on the walk. Laura shares her worried with Michelle. Pati arrives on the walk and is presented with 4 vessels. The stones read: Pati must swap teams and choose a replacement, Pati must choose 2 people to swap teams, a red team members to choose a blue team member to decide which 2 people should swap. She chose that she would have to choose the 2 people to swap. Pati decided to swap Laura for Mel. Shannan is gutted to lose Mel. 
|1,076,000
|-
|height="10"|18/03-6
|Friday, 23 February
|Major Challenge (#3): Beach assault – The challenge saw the teams had to fill up sandbags and travel through an obstacle course to build them up at the end for one person to reach a handle and set off a flare. The first team to set off their flare would win packages from home whikle the losers would have to give up their trainer till after weigh-in. 
|
|-
! colspan=5 style="background-color:#F79A3A"| Week 4
|-
|height="10"|19/04-1
|Sunday, 25 February
|The Weigh-in (#3)
|1,034,000
|-
|height="10"|20/04-2
|Monday, 26 February
|Elimination (#3): Michael
|1,111,000
|-
|height="10"|21/04-3
|Tuesday, 27 February
|Minor Challenge (#4): Jump and Duck Obstacle
|1,080,000
|-
|height="10"|22/04-4
|Wednesday, 28 February
|Temptation (#4): Sushi Train
|1,043,000
|-
|height="10"|23/04-5
|Thursday, 1 March
|The Walk (#4): Munnalita
|1,101,000
|-
|height="10"|24/04-6
|Friday, 2 March
|Major Challenge (#4): Moving house
|
|-
! colspan=5 style="background-color:#F79A3A"| Week 5
|-
|height="10"|25/05-1
|Sunday, 4 March
|The Weigh-in (#4)
|915,000
|-
|height="10"|26/05-2
|Monday, 5 March
|Elimination (#4): Gerard
|887,000
|-
|height="10"|27/05-3
|Tuesday, 6 March
|Minor Challenge (#4): Heartbreak hill
|1,069,000
|-
|height="10"|28/05-4
|Wednesday, 7 March
|Temptation (#5): Food deli
|1,034,000
|-
|height="10"|29/05-5
|Thursday, 8 March
|The Walk (#5): Courtney
|1,074,000
|-
|height="10"|30/05-6
|Friday, 9 March
|Major Challenge (#5): Basketball match
|
|-
! colspan=5 style="background-color:#F79A3A"| Week 6
|-
|height="10"|31/06-1
|Sunday, 11 March
|The Weigh-in (#5)
|1,115,000
|-
|height="10"|32/06-2
|Monday, 12 March
|Elimination (#5): Marty
|1,272,000
|-
|height="10"|33/06-3
|Tuesday, 13 March
|The Game So Far
|1,177,000
|-
|height="10"|34/06-4
|Wednesday, 14 March
|Minor Challenge (#6): The Power balls Challenge
|974,000
|-
|height="10"|35/06-5
|Thursday, 15 March
|Duos Decided
|972,000
|-
|height="10"|36/06-6
|Friday, 16 March
|Major Challenge (#6): Hangman Challenge
|
|-
! colspan=5 style="background-color:#F79A3A"| Week 7
|-
|height="10"|37/07-1
|Sunday, 18 March
|The Weigh-in (#6)
|1,220,000
|-
|height="10"|38/07-2
|Monday, 19 March
|Elimination (#6): Double Elimination, Greg & Mel
|1,289,000
|-
|height="10"|39/07-3
|Tuesday, 20 March
|The Biggest Twist Thus Far: The Outsiders
|1,229,000
|-
|height="10"|40/07-4
|Wednesday, 21 March
|Minor Challenge (#7): Wood Challenge
|1,114,000
|-
|height="10"|41/07-5
|Thursday, 22 March
|The Walk (#7): Chris & Kimberlie
|1,073,000
|-
|height="10"|42/07-6
|Friday, 23 March
|Major Challenge (#7): Commando Challenge
|
|-
! colspan=5 style="background-color:#F79A3A"| Week 8
|-
|height="10"|43/08-1
|Sunday, 25 March
|The Weigh-in (#7)
|1,290,000
|-
|height="10"|44/08-2
|Monday, 26 March
|Elimination (#7): Laura
|1,295,000
|-
|height="10"|45/08-3
|Tuesday, 27 March
|Make Overs
|1,162,000
|-
|height="10"|46/08-4
|Wednesday, 28 March
|Temptation (#8)
|1,229,000
|-
|height="10"|47/08-5
|Thursday, 29 March
|Major Challenge (#8) – bob and jillian's tower climb part  A
|1,121,000
|-
|height="10"|48/08-6
|Friday, 30 March
|Major Challenge (#8) – bob and jillian's tower climb Part B
|1,036,000
|-
! colspan=5 style="background-color:#F79A3A"| Week 9
|-
|height="10"|49/09-1
|Sunday, 1 April
|The Weigh-in (#8)
|1,562,000
|-
|height="10"|50/09-2
|Monday, 2 April
|Elimination (#8): Marty
|1,274,000
|-
|height="10"|51/09-3
|Tuesday, 3 April
|Fly to New Zealand 
|
|-
|height="10"|52/09-4
|Wednesday, 4 April
|Fear Challenges – Part A: Courtney, Kimberlie, Chris
|
|-
|height="10"|53/09-5
|Thursday, 5 April
|Fear Challenges – Part B: Pati, Munnalita, Damien
|
|-
|height="10"|54/09-6
|Friday, 6 April
|Super Challenge" – Damien eliminated
|
|-
! colspan=5 style="background-color:#F79A3A"| Week 10
|-
|height="10"|55/10-1
|Sunday, 8 April
|The Weigh-in: 
|1,088,000
|-
|height="10"|56/10-2
|Monday, 9 April
|Elimination (#9): Courtney
|1,319,000
|-
|height="10"|57/10-3
|Tuesday, 10 April
|Second Chance Challenge: Balance endurance
|1,299,000
|-
|height="10"|58/10-4
|Wednesday, 11 April
|Second Chance Temptation: Platters
|1,140,000
|-
|height="10"|59/10-5
|Thursday, 12 April
|No I in Team|1,075,000
|-
|height="10"|60/10-6
|Friday, 13 April
|Wildcard Super Challenge: Beach triathlon
|
|-
! colspan=5 style="background-color:#F79A3A"| Week 11
|-
|height="10"|61/11-1
|Sunday, 15 April
|The Weigh-in (#10)
|1,310,000
|-
|height="10"|62/11-2
|Monday, 16 April
|Elimination (#10): Kimberlie
|1,302,000
|-
|height="10"|63/11-3
|Tuesday, 17 April
|Train the Trainers|1,186,000
|-
|height="10"|64/11-4
|Wednesday, 18 April
|Final Challenge: Personal beach dig
|1,195,000
|-
|height="10"|65/11-5
|Thursday, 19 April
|Final Weigh-in and Elimination (#11)
|1,323,000
|-
|height="10"|66/11-6
|Friday, 20 April
|Final Elimination and Going Home (#11): Munnalita
|1,126,000
|-
! colspan=5 style="background-color:#F79A3A"| Week 12
|-
|height="10"|67/12-1
|Sunday, 22 April
|Trainer's Choice Award|1,273,000
|-
|height="10"|68/12-2
|Thursday, 26 April
|Season Finale': Contestant Reunion
|2,023,000
|-
|}

Season 3: 2008

Season 4: 2009
The fourth season started off with a peak of 1.7 million viewers and averaged 1.2 million over the premiere episode. The finale night scored 1.7 million, beating Underbelly's: A Tale Of Two Cities, with a successful finish of 2 million viewers when the winner was announced.

Season 5: 2010

Season 6: 2011
The sixth season, also known as The Biggest Loser Families'', premiered on 30 January 2011 with 1.356 million viewers tuning in, making it the fourth-watched program that night.

Season 7: 2012
The seventh season also known as The Biggest Loser Singles aired on 23 January 2012.

Season 8: 2013
The eighth season also known as The Biggest Loser: The Next Generation aired on 17 March 2013.

References

External links
Official Website
TV.com Episode Guide
Unofficial blog recaps
Unofficial Fan Forum: Recaps

Australia
Lists of Australian non-fiction television series episodes
Lists of reality television series episodes